Abdulla Atief (Arabic:عبد الله عاطف) (born 14 December 1985) is a Qatari professional footballer who plays as a left back.

Career
He formerly played for Al-Khor, Al-Arabi, Muaither, Al-Sailiya, Mesaimeer, Al-Shamal, and Al-Waab .

References

External links
 

Living people
Qatari footballers
Al-Khor SC players
Al-Arabi SC (Qatar) players
Muaither SC players
Al-Sailiya SC players
Mesaimeer SC players
Al-Shamal SC players
Al-Waab SC players
Qatar Stars League players
Qatari Second Division players
Association football fullbacks
Place of birth missing (living people)
1985 births